Yamchi is a city in East Azerbaijan Province, Iran.

Yamchi may also refer to:
 Yamchi-ye Olya, Ardabil Province
 Yamchi-ye Sofla, Ardabil Province
 Yamchi, Golestan
 Yamchi, Mazandaran
 Yamchi, Zanjan
 Yamchi District, in East Azerbaijan Province